Nicholforest is a civil parish in the Carlisle district of Cumbria, England.  It contains seven listed buildings that are recorded in the National Heritage List for England.  Of these, one is listed at Grade II*, the middle of the three grades, and the others are at Grade II, the lowest grade.  The parish is almost entirely rural, and the listed buildings consist of a country house that originated as a tower house, an outbuilding associated with it, a farmhouse and a barn, a milestone, a church, and a monument.


Key

Buildings

References

Citations

Sources

Lists of listed buildings in Cumbria